The six-hour clock is a traditional timekeeping system used in the Thai and formerly the Lao language and the Khmer language, alongside the official 24-hour clock. Like other common systems, it counts twenty-four hours in a day, but divides the day into four quarters, counting six hours in each. The hours in each quarter (with the exception of the sixth hour in each quarter) are told with period-designating words or phrases, which are:

... mong chao for the first half of daytime (07:00 to 12:59)
Bai ... mong for the latter half of daytime (13:00 to 18:59)
... thum for the first half of nighttime (19:00 to 00:59)
Ti ... for the latter half of nighttime (01:00 to 06:59)

These terms are thought to have originated from the sounds of traditional timekeeping devices. The gong was used to announce the hours in daytime, and the drum at night. Hence the terms mong, an onomatopoeia of the sound of the gong, and thum, that of the sound of the drum. Ti is a verb meaning to hit or strike, and is presumed to have originated from the act of striking the timekeeping device itself. Chao and bai translate as morning and afternoon respectively, and help to differentiate the two daytime quarters.

The sixth hours of each quarter are told by a different set of terms. The sixth hour at dawn is called yam rung, and the sixth hour at dusk is called yam kham, both references to the act of striking the gong or drum in succession to announce the turning of day (yam), where rung and kham, meaning dawn and dusk, denote the time of these occurrences. The midday and midnight hours are respectively known as thiang (or thiang wan) and thiang khuen, both of which literally translate as midday and midnight.

Midnight is also called song yam (note that yam is a different word), a reference to the end of the second three-hour period of the night watch (song translates as the number two). In addition, hok (6) thum and ti hok may also be used to refer to the hours of midnight and dawn, following general usage for the other hours, although more rarely; and the fourth to sixth hours of the second daytime half may also be told as ...mong yen, yen meaning evening.

The system has been used in some form since the days of the Ayutthaya Kingdom, but was codified similarly to its present form only in 1901 by King Chulalongkorn in Royal Gazette 17:206. Nowadays, it is used only in colloquial speech. However, a corrupted form of the six-hour clock is more frequently encountered, where usually the first half of daytime (including the sixth hour of the preceding quarter) is counted as in the twelve-hour clock, i.e. hok (6) mong chao, chet (7) mong, etc., up to sip et (11) mong.

The six-hour clock system was abolished in Laos and Cambodia during the French protectorate, and the French 24-hour clock system (for example, 3h00) has been used since.

Clock format

A comparison of the systems is as follows:

* The word chao (เช้า) is optional here since the numbers 7 to 11 are not used elsewhere
** Conversationally, si mong yen (สี่โมงเย็น) and ha mong yen (ห้าโมงเย็น) are also spoken if considered as evening

See also
12-hour clock
24-hour clock
Date and time notation in Thailand
The Italian six-hour clock, another six-hour system.
Thai calendars, including the Thai solar calendar
 Thai numerals
 Time in Thailand

References

Thai culture
Time measurement systems
Date and time representation